Empire Airlines Flight 8284 was a cargo flight operated by Empire Airlines for FedEx Feeder from Fort Worth Alliance Airport to Lubbock Preston Smith International Airport, Texas. On January 27, 2009, it crashed on final approach to its destination. Both crew members survived with minor injuries but the aircraft was written off.

Aircraft history
Flight 8284 was operated using an ATR-42-320 (registration number:  N902FX), manufactured in 1990 by ATR. Before being delivered to Empire Airlines in 2003, and later leased to FedEx in the same year, the aircraft served for three previous airlines: Bar Harbor Airlines, Continental Express and ExpressJet Airlines.

Flight details
The captain was 52-year-old Rodney Holberton with a total of 13,935 flight hours, with 12,742 hours as pilot-in-command (PIC). He had 2,052 hours on the ATR 42, 1,896 as PIC. The first officer was 26-year-old Heather Cornell with 2,109 hours, according to the records of Empire Airlines. She had 130 hours operating the ATR 42 as second-in-command.

Accident

The aircraft approached Lubbock International Airport at around 4:30 am Central Standard Time in freezing mist.

During the approach, a flight control problem prevented deployment of the flaps. The first officer continued the approach while the captain attempted to fix the flaps issue. The crew pulled up 17 seconds after the initial alarm. The aircraft then entered an aerodynamic stall and crashed. The aircraft landed short of the runway threshold, and skidded  down and off runway 17R. A small fire began shortly after.

Airport officials said that weather conditions did not contribute to the crash.

Investigation

The National Transportation Safety Board (NTSB) investigated the cause of the accident. The flight data recorder and cockpit voice recorder showed that the crew continued the landing after the flaps failed to deploy rather than conducting a go-around. The crew also failed to apply maximum engine thrust immediately after the stall, waiting 17 seconds after an TAWS warning had sounded before applying thrust. In postaccident interviews, the captain said that he had sleep fatigue before the flight due to "high-workload situations" which affected his performance. After the investigation was completed the NTSB released their final report in 2011. It concluded with investigators stating that "The National Transportation Safety Board determines that the probable cause of this accident was the flight crew's failure to monitor and maintain a minimum safe airspeed while executing an instrument approach in icing conditions, which resulted in an aerodynamic stall at low altitude. Contributing to the accident were 1) the flight crew's failure to follow published standard operating procedures in response to a flap anomaly, 2) the captain's decision to continue with the unstabilized approach, 3) the flight crew's poor crew resource management, and 4) fatigue due to the time of day in which the accident occurred and a cumulative sleep debt, which likely impaired the captain's performance."

Aftermath
N902FX was badly damaged in the accident and was written off. The crew members were sent to hospital for minor injuries, and were later released. Both returned to flying with FedEx Express a month later.

The NTSB issued nine safety recommendations as a result of the crash, including recommendations to prevent in-flight icing. The crash led to the EASA reviewing airplane stick shakers to protect from stalls and adopting a rule regarding the simulation of icing conditions in flight simulators.

References

External links
 ASN Accident Database
National Transportation Safety Board
Summary
NTSB Docket including Cockpit Voice Recorder transcript and Flight Data Recorder readout

2009 in Texas
Cargo aircraft
FedEx Express accidents and incidents
accidents and incidents involving the ATR 42
Aviation accidents and incidents in Texas
Aviation accidents and incidents in 2009
January 2009 events in the United States
Airliner accidents and incidents caused by pilot error